Raja Mahmud ibni Almarhum Sultan Abdul Jalil, known as Raja Melewar, was the first  Yamtuan Besar (equivalent to a sultan) of Negeri Sembilan, Malaysia. He was a prince from the Pagaruyung Kingdom in the island of Sumatra, now situated within Indonesia.

History
The Minangkabau people were the first migrant community to settle in the northern part of the Johor Sultanate which eventually formed the confederation of Negri Sembilan circa 14th century. The population began to control local politics. By 1760, Johor, which was having trouble from the Dutch, allowed the state to appoint a raja, or sultan, from Minangkabau in Sumatra.

Between 1760 and 1770, a council of leaders known as the datuk-datuk penghulu luak (the predecessor of the datuk-datuk undang today) left for Pagaruyung in Minangkabau in search of a leader. The Raja of Pagaruyung, who was believed to be a descendant of Alexander the Great, gave them a leader in the form of his son, Raja Mahmud. Raja Mahmud later became known as Raja Melewar in Negri Sembilan.

Before Raja Melewar left for the Malay Peninsula, a royalty named Raja Khatib was sent to Negri Sembilan to oversee Raja Melewar's coronation preparations. However, upon his arrival to Negeri Sembilan, Raja Khatib lied to the locals and claimed to be the prince sent from Pagaruyung. The locals believed him, and Raja Khatib was deemed the new king. As for Raja Melewar, he first sailed to Johor to ask for the Sultan of Johor's consent to rule over Negri Sembilan. The sultan did not object and conferred upon Raja Melewar the authority to reign over Negri Sembilan. Raja Melewar's expedition marched to Negri Sembilan through Naning.

At Naning, Raja Melewar's forces met Bugis warchief Daeng Kemboja. War ensued, but the Bugis forces were defeated. Upon his arrival to Negri Sembilan in 1773, Raja Melewar was deemed king and proclaimed as Yamtuan Besar in Kampung Penajis in Rembau. Raja Melewar learned of Raja Khatib's scheme and, becoming the undisputed ruler of the state, declared war against Raja Khatib. Raja Melewar later relocated his palace to Seri Menanti, which remains the royal capital of Negri Sembilan today.

Following Raja Melewar's death in 1795, rather than selecting his son as their new leader, the datuk-datuk penghulu luak once again journeyed to their ancestral land. The Raja of Pagaruyung gave another son, Raja Hitam, to serve as their new Yamtuan. Raja Hitam married Raja Melewar's daughter, Tengku Aishah, but they did not have children.

Selecting a ruler of Negri Sembilan by a council of ruling chiefs in the state, or the datuk-datuk undang, became an implemented system. Under which, the person selected assumes the position of Yang di-Pertuan Besar, or Yamtuan Besar, a post that began in 1773. This system would became the inspiration behind the position of the Yang di-Pertuan Agong (Paramount Ruler) of Malaysia, where each ruler from the nine monarchical states is elected by the Conference of Rulers every 5 years.

References 

 Information from Warisan Diraja Negri Sembilan Darul Khusus

History of Negeri Sembilan
Royal House of Negeri Sembilan
Yang di-Pertuan Besar of Negeri Sembilan
Minangkabau people
Malaysian people of Minangkabau descent
1795 deaths
Year of birth unknown
18th-century monarchs in Asia
Founding monarchs